The Diocese of Manaccenser is a suppressed and titular see of the Roman Catholic Church.

The diocese of Manaccenser is ancient, and was originally founded on a Roman town of the Roman province of Mauretania Caesariensis (Roman North Africa) that went by the same name. That ancient town is now lost to history but it was in the region of Cherchell in today's Algeria.

The only known bishop of this diocese from antiquity is Vittore, who took part in the synod assembled in Carthage in 484 by the Vandal King Huneric. After the synod, Vittore was exiled. Today Manaccenser survives as a titular bishopric, and the current bishop is Peter John Elliott, auxiliary bishop of Melbourne, who replaced James Joseph O'Brien in 2007.

References

Archaeological sites in Algeria
Catholic titular sees in Africa
Roman towns and cities in Mauretania Caesariensis
Ancient Berber cities